The portal-visceral hypothesis describes a possible mechanism for some of the health effects of obesity, particularly the metabolic syndrome.  It says that obesity (especially visceral obesity) results in increased circulation of free fatty acids and thus, via Randle's effect, in insulin resistance.

The word "portal" refers to the hepatic portal circulation from the digestive system to the liver.  The portal-visceral hypothesis is a replacement for the earlier "portal hypothesis", which said that visceral obesity leads to an increase in fatty acid levels specifically in the portal vein.

References

Diabetes
Medical conditions related to obesity